Encuentro is an Argentine television channel owned and operated by the Argentine Ministry of Education. It began broadcasting in 2007 through cable television operators in the country. It airs as an independent channel and also as a programming block on Canal 7 from Argentina.

See also
List of documentary television channels
Darío Sztajnszrajber

External links

 Official website

Television stations in Argentina
Television channels and stations established in 2007